The Roman Catholic Diocese of Concordia in America (its present title as a titular see) was founded on August 2, 1887, by Pope Leo XIII and based in Concordia, Kansas. On December 23, 1947, the Diocese was renamed the Roman Catholic Diocese of Salina. In 1995, the Diocese of Concordia was restored as a titular see.

The Latin adjective referring to this episcopal see is Concordiensis, while that referring to the Roman Catholic Diocese of Concordia, a residential see in Argentina, is Foroconcordianus.

Titular bishops
Antonio Sozzo

Notes

Concordia
History of Kansas
Catholic Church in Kansas
Roman Catholic Ecclesiastical Province of Kansas City
Roman Catholic Diocese of Salina
Cloud County, Kansas